Plymouth Argyle Women Football Club, formerly known as Plymouth Argyle Ladies Football Club, are a women's amateur association football club based in the city of Plymouth, Devon, England.

Founded in 1975, they come under the bracket of Plymouth Argyle F.C., and play their home games at Manadon Sports Hub, Plymouth, which is owned and operated by the PAFC Community Trust.

History 

The club was formed in 1975 as a result of a 5-a-side league at the Mayflower Leisure Centre.  Two teams merged in order to enter an 11-a-side football tournament in Newquay, Cornwall with the team creating the name of 'Plymouth Pilgrims'.  Following the success of the tournament, Plymouth Pilgrims played in numerous competitions throughout the 1970s and 1980s with the most notable achievement being reaching the quarter-finals of the Women's FA Cup in both 1976 and 1977.
 
The club name changed to 'Saltash Pilgrims' in the late 1990s and the early part of the year 2000 to reflect their home ground at the time – Saltash United's Kimberly Stadium in Cornwall.  It was not until the 2001–02 season that the club, then competing in the SW Combination League, were invited to compete under the umbrella of Plymouth Argyle F.C., and Plymouth Argyle Ladies were formed.
 
In August 2020, Ryan Perks was appointed manager. A year later, ahead of the 2021–22 season, the club changed name, replacing the suffix Ladies Football Club with Women Football Club, as the club transferred from under the management of the Argyle Community Trust, to being taken under the professional wing of Plymouth Argyle.

Players

Current squad

Retired numbers
12 – The Green Army

Notable players 
Jemma Rose – England
Chloe Roberts – England U15
Chynna Evans – England U15

Honours 
The club held the Devon Women's County Cup for a record number of years from 2002 to 2006 with a second-placed finish in the SW Combination league (Two steps below the National Premier League) in the 2006–07 season.

Sponsorship and fundraising 
Since 2017–18, PAWFC's kits have been sponsored by the same main sponsor that Plymouth Argyle have been, with both the logos of Ginsters and Project35 appearing on shirts.

The club also does its own fundraising, including a weekly half time draw, weekly match day programmes advertising local businesses and individuals, match day sponsors, and individual player sponsors.

References 

Plymouth Argyle F.C.
Women's football clubs in England
1975 establishments in England
FA Women's National League teams